Gustavo Sotelo (born March 16, 1968 in Asunción, Paraguay) is a former Paraguayan footballer who played for Clubs of Paraguay, Uruguay, Brazil and Chile.He played for the Paraguay national football team in the Copa América Ecuador 1993 and Uruguay 1995.

Teams
  Cerro Porteño 1990-1994
  Cruzeiro 1995
  Olimpia 1996
  Guaraní 1997-1998
  Rangers 1998
  Guaraní 1999
  Rentistas 2000
  Colegiales 2001
  Sportivo Luqueño 2002

Titles
  Cerro Porteño 1992 and 1994 (Paraguayan Primera División Championship)

External links
 Gustavo Sotelo at playmakerstats.com (English version of ceroacero.es)
 

1968 births
Living people
Sportspeople from Asunción
Paraguayan footballers
Paraguayan expatriate footballers
Paraguay international footballers
1993 Copa América players
1995 Copa América players
Cerro Porteño players
Club Olimpia footballers
Club Guaraní players
C.A. Rentistas players
Atlético Colegiales players
Sportivo Luqueño players
Rangers de Talca footballers
Cruzeiro Esporte Clube players
Chilean Primera División players
Expatriate footballers in Chile
Expatriate footballers in Brazil
Expatriate footballers in Uruguay
Association football midfielders